Alberto Acquadro (born 27 March 1996) is an Italian football player who plays as a midfielder for  club Turris.

Career
He made his Serie C debut for Venezia on 27 August 2016 in a game against Forlì.

On 23 July 2021, he signed with Siena.

On 20 January 2022, he signed a contract with Vis Pesaro until the end of the 2022–23 season, with an option to extend for an additional year.

On 18 July 2022, Acquadro moved to Turris on a two-year deal.

References

External links
 
 

1995 births
Living people
People from Gattinara
Sportspeople from the Province of Vercelli
Footballers from Piedmont
Italian footballers
Association football midfielders
Serie C players
Serie D players
A.S.D. La Biellese players
Venezia F.C. players
U.S. Triestina Calcio 1918 players
Alma Juventus Fano 1906 players
Taranto F.C. 1927 players
A.C.R. Messina players
A.C.N. Siena 1904 players
Vis Pesaro dal 1898 players
S.S. Turris Calcio players